The North Western Football Association is an Australian rules football competition based on the North West Coast of Tasmania, Australia.

Origins
The North Western Football Association was formed at a meeting at the Formby Hotel in 1894 and is the oldest continuously running football competition in the state of Tasmania. The first clubs were Devonport, Latrobe, Mersey and Ulverstone.

The NWFA was the senior football body on the coast until a break away group of teams formed the NWFU in 1910. 
The NWFA was then looked upon as a junior competition feeding the NWFU and later the TFL Statewide League until their demise and later the NTFL teams.

The competition has seen more than fifty teams participate in its history from all parts of the North West Coast indicating the rise and fall and changing fortunes of many towns throughout history. Clubs such as Burnie Tigers, Cooee Bulldogs, Penguin, Mole Creek, Wilmot, Barrington, Don, East Devonport, Moriarty, Sassafras, Melrose and Gowrie Park are among many to have played in the NWFA.
 
From mid-1938 until it went into recess during World War II, the NWFA played under VFA rules, a code of rules established by the Victorian Football Association as a rival to the national rules. This most notably meant that throwing the ball was legal during those years. The NWFA was one of the highest level competitions outside the VFA to play under those rules. Upon its resumption after World War II, the NWFA returned to playing under the traditional rules.
The Association currently operates as a nine club competition and the medal awarded to the Association's Best & Fairest player is the Les Hicks Medal.

Seniors Premierships
List of NWFA Seniors Premiership teams.

1894 Devonport 
1895 Barrington 
1896 Barrington 
1897 Devonport 
1898 Mersey 
1899 Mersey 
1900 Ulverstone 
1901 Mersey 
1902 Mersey 
1903 Ulverstone 
1904 Mersey 
1905 Mersey 
1906 Ulverstone 
1907 Latrobe 
1908 Mersey 
1909 Mersey 
1910 Wesley Vale 
1911 no details
1912 Don 
1913 no details
1914 no details
1915 Competition in Recess Due to WWI
1916 Competition in Recess Due to WWI
1917 Competition in Recess Due to WWI
1918 Competition in Recess Due to WWI
1919 Competition in Recess Due to Influenza Epidemic
1920 Melrose 
1921 Wesley Vale 
1922 Forth 
1923 Mersey 
1924 Mersey 
1925 Wesley Vale 
1926 Wesley Vale 
1927 Mersey 
1928 Mersey 
1929 Wesley Vale 
1930 Wesley Vale 
1931 Wesley Vale 
1932 Mersey 
1933 Railton 
1934 Wesley Vale 
1935 Forth 
1936 Wesley Vale 
1937 Forth 
1938 Forth 
1939 Forth 
1940 Forth 
1941 Competition in Recess Due to WWII
1942 Competition in Recess Due to WWII
1943 Competition in Recess Due to WWII
1944 Competition in Recess Due to WWII
1945 Latrobe Rovers 
1946 Railton 
1947 Railton 
1948 Forth 
1949 Wesley Vale 
1950 Forth 
1951 Ex Servicemen 
1952 Ex Servicemen 
1953 Ex Servicemen 
1954 Spreyton 
1955 Railton 
1956 Forth 
1957 Forth 
1958 Forth 
1959 Wesley Vale 
1960 Wesley Vale 
1961 Railton 
1962 Sheffield 
1963 Wesley Vale 
1964 Sheffield 
1965 Forth 
1966 Railton 
1967 Gowrie Park 
1968 Gowrie Park 
1969 Gowrie Park 
1970 Gowrie Park 
1971 Ulverstone District 
1972 Forth 
1973 Sheffield 
1974 Forth 
1975 Spreyton 
1976 Spreyton 
1977 Spreyton 
1978 Spreyton 
1979 Wesley Vale 
1980 Forth 
1981 Turners Beach 
1982 Turners Beach 
1983 Turners Beach 
1984 Spreyton 
1985 Motton Preston 
1986 Motton Preston 
1987 Sheffield 
1988 Sheffield 
1989 Wesley Vale 
1990 Spreyton 
1991 Ulverstone District 
1992 Ulverstone District 
1993 Ulverstone District 
1994 Sheffield 
1995 Turners Beach 
1996 Wesley Vale 
1997 Wesley Vale 
1998 Rosebery Toorak 
1999 Rosebery Toorak 
2000 Sheffield 
2001 Spreyton 
2002 East Ulverstone 
2003 Sheffield 
2004 Motton Preston
2005 Forth
2006 Motton Preston
2007 Forth
2008 Wesley Vale 
2009 Wesley Vale 
2010 Motton Preston
2011 Spreyton
2012 Motton Preston
2013 Motton Preston
2014 Turners Beach
2015 Forth
2016 Forth
2017 Wesley Vale
2018 Forth
2019 Wesley Vale
2020 Motton Preston
2021 Motton Preston

Current NWFA Clubs

NWFA Record Score

 Sheffield Seniors – 69.29 (443) vs Rosebery Toorak 0.0 in 2021.
 Forth Reserves - 66.24 (420) vs Spreyton 0.0 in 2013.

NWFA Individual Goalkicking Record (Match)
 Jamie Auton – (31) – East Ulverstone v West Ulverstone in 2006.
Note: This is a current Tasmanian state record.

Leading Goal Kickers

2009 Ladder

2010 Ladder

2011 Ladder

2012 Ladder

2013 Ladder

2014 Ladder

References

External links
Official website
Tasmania on FullPoints Footy

Australian rules football competitions in Tasmania